The Design 1015 ship (full name Emergency Fleet Corporation Design 1015) was a steel-hulled cargo ship design approved for production by the United States Shipping Boards Emergency Fleet Corporation (EFT) during World War I. They were referred to as the "Moore & Scott"-type.

They were mostly built at West Coast yards:
 Groton Iron Works, Groton, Connecticut, 6 ships, 3 cancelled, 3 completed
 Moore Shipbuilding and Drydock Company, Oakland, California, 26 ships of which 8 were converted to reefers, no cancellations
 Pacific Coast Shipbuilding Company, Bay Point, California, 10 ships, no cancellations
 Seattle North Pacific Shipbuilding Company, Seattle, Washington, 10 ships, no cancellations
 G. M. Standifer Construction Company, Vancouver, Washington, 15 ships, no cancellations
 Union Construction Comapany, Oakland, California, 10 ships, no cancellations
 Virginia Shipbuilding Company, Alexandria, Virginia, 12 ships, 2 cancelled, 9 completed, 1 partially completed

References

Bibliography

External links 
 EFC Design 1015: Illustrations

Standard ship types of the United States
 Design 1015 ships